Htet Naung is a Burmese politician who served as an Pyithu Hluttaw MP for Lahe Township. He is a member of the National League for Democracy.

Early life and education
Won Hla was born on 4 September 1984 in Lahe Township, Myanmar. He is an ethnic Naga.

Political career
He is a member of the National League for Democracy. In the 2015 Myanmar general election, he was elected as an Pyithu Hluttaw member of parliament and elected representative from Lahe Township

References

National League for Democracy politicians
1984 births
Living people
People from Sagaing Region
Naga people